Chris Vaefaga (born 1 November 1987) is a New Zealand professional rugby league footballer for the Bulldogs in the National Rugby League. He is a Samoa international.

Background
Chris Vaefaga was born in Auckland, New Zealand

References

1987 births
Living people
Expatriate rugby league players in Australia
New Zealand expatriate rugby league players
New Zealand expatriate sportspeople in Australia
New Zealand sportspeople of Samoan descent
Rugby league five-eighths
Rugby league hookers
Rugby league locks
Samoa national rugby league team players